= Chanchai Phairatkun =

Thai politician (1929–2022)

Member of the House of Representatives of Thailand
- In office 27 July 1986 – 29 April 1988
- Constituency: Chiang Mai province

Personal details
- Born: 5 April 1929
- Died: June 2022 (aged 93)
- Party: United Democratic Party
- Education: Benchamaracharungsarit School

Chanchai Phairatkun (Thai: ชาญชัย ไพรัชกุล; 5 April 1929 – 6 June 2022) was a Thai politician. A member of the United Democratic Party, he served in the House of Representatives from 1986 to 1988.

He died on 6 June 2022 at the age of 93.
